was a town located in Kitakatsuragi District, Nara Prefecture, Japan.

On October 1, 2004, Shinjō, along with the town of Taima (also from Kitakatsuragi District), was merged to create the city of Katsuragi.

Dissolved municipalities of Nara Prefecture

Populated places disestablished in 2004